Her Summer Hero is a lost 1928 silent film comedy drama directed by James Dugan and starring Sally Blane, Hugh Trevor and Harold Goodwin.

Cast
Hugh Trevor - Kenneth Holmes
Harold Goodwin - Herb Darrow
Duane Thompson - Joan Stanton
James Pierce - Chris
Cleve Moore - Al Stanton
Sally Blane - Grave

References

External links

1928 films
Lost American films
American black-and-white films
Film Booking Offices of America films
American silent feature films
1928 comedy-drama films
1920s English-language films
1928 lost films
Lost comedy-drama films
1920s American films
Silent American comedy-drama films